Tailored fiber placement (TFP) is a textile manufacturing technique based on the principle of sewing for a continuous placement of fibrous material for composite components. The fibrous material is fixed with an upper and lower stitching thread on a base material. Compared to other textile manufacturing processes fiber material can be placed near net-shape in curvilinear patterns upon a base material in order to create stress adapted composite parts.

History
TFP technology was introduced in the early 1990s by the IPF Dresden. At the beginning handmade stitched reinforcement structures (preforms) were manufactured initialized by an industry inquiry about stress adapted fiber-reinforced plastic (FRP) parts with a curvilinear pattern. An adaptation of this method to industrial embroidery machines, by using the sewing capabilities of those automates, was implemented in the mid-90s. The technology was named Tailored Fiber Placement, which describes the variable axial near-net-shape fibre placement capabilities. Nowadays, the Tailored Fiber Placement is already in several companies a well-established textile technology for dry preform manufacturing applying TFP machines by the manufacturer TAJIMA.

Principle of the technology

Based on embroidery machinery used in the garment textile industry, the machines have been adapted to deposit and stitch fiber roving material onto a base material. Roving material, mostly common carbon fibers, from about 3,000 up to 50,000 filaments can be applied. The preform is produced continuously by the placement of a single roving. The roving material pulled off a spool is guided by a pipe which is positioned in front of the stitching needle. The roving pipe and the frame, where the base material is fixed onto, move synchronized stepwise to perform a zigzag stitch relative to needle position. The stitching head equipped with roving spool, pipe and needle can rotate arbitrarily  360 degrees. During each stitch the upper thread is pulled through the base material and looped around the lower thread spool. Hence a double backstitch is performed. Currently, up to 800 stitches per minute can be achieved. 
The base material can be a 2D-textile such as woven or non-woven fabric or a matrix-compatible foil material for thermoplastic composites. The stitching path can be designed in form of a pattern either with the help of classical design embroidery software or more recently by use of 2D-CAD systems. Afterwards necessary information of the stitch positions are added to the pattern with the help of so-called punch software and finally transferred to the TFP machine.

The infiltration of TFP-preforms can be done with conventional processing techniques such as resin transfer moulding, vacuum bag molding, pressing and autoclave moulding. In the case of thermoplastic composites the matrix material and the reinforcement fibers can be placed simultaneously e.g. in the form of films or fibers. The base material can then be a thermoplastic foil which melts during the consolidation process and becomes part of the matrix. This type is ideally suited for deep-drawn TFP-preforms.

Advantages of the TFP technology
• Net-shape manufacturing reduces costs and waste of valuable reinforcement fibers, e.g. carbon fibers
• Automatic deposition ensures high accuracy and repeatability of amount and orientation of fibers
• TFP machines with multiple heads can be applied to achieve a reasonable productivity; each head is manufacturing in a synchronized way the same preform
• Fibers can be orientated in an arbitrary direction in order to manufacture highly stress adapted composite parts
• A variety of fibers such as carbon, glass, basalt, aramid, natural, thermoplastic, ceramic fibers and also metallic threads can be applied and combined within one preform

Optimizations using TFP over other laminate technologies

Optimization one: Reduce waste material
One of the leading material costs of many traditional carbon fiber composite construction techniques, includes the large amount of waste material generated. In many hand lay-up processes that use carbon fiber woven material, waste materials can easily account for 50% or more of the total weight of carbon used. This waste is generated as the fabric is initially cut before impregnation with the matrix material. Additional waste is generated after the composite has cured during the post processing steps where the shape is further refined. Tailored fiber placement is unique in its ability to reduce waste material and thereby optimize material cost. By controlling the path of the tow material as it is stitched into the desired geometry, material is only placed where it is needed in the final preform. Areas of fabric that would have to be cut out in traditional laminate design are simply left unstitched. This process reduces both the initial waste produced when cutting woven fabrics to shape and reduces post processing waste due to the ability to conform to complex geometries.

Optimization two: Hybrid carbon fiber and glass fiber composites
An additional drawback of traditional laminate processes is the inability to rapidly change materials volumetrically to benefit from their combined advantages. Tailored fiber placement is a method for quickly and effectively creating these multi-material composites. For example, when a structural analysis is performed on a part, it might be discovered that the part only requires areas of localized stiffness. In this case, carbon fiber, with its properties of high stiffness, can be placed exactly at the areas and geometries of the part requiring high stiffness. It would be cost-inefficient to fill the entire part with highly stiff carbon fiber, especially when that stiffness is not required in certain locations. Therefore, to further reduce cost, the areas around the carbon fiber stiffened geometry that do not require high stiffness can be filled in with lower cost materials such as glass fiber or even hemp fibers. Tailored fiber placement allows these material transitions to seamlessly occur.

Optimization three: Tunable fiber alignment and geometric tailor-ability
Once of the largest benefits of using tailored fiber placement to optimize a design, is the ability to precisely control where each tow of carbon fiber is placed in a design. This allows the composites designer to further optimize the materials properties, reducing the need for additional material. For example, complex tow paths of carbon fiber can be embroidered to perfectly resist the applied loads. By aligning fibers to their principal stresses, additional mechanical support is provided without using additional material. Further optimizations can occur by selectively reinforcing holes and circular drill points. In traditional laminate design, these holes can serve as areas of crack propagation due to the orthogonal nature of the woven fabric used. Tailored fiber placement can be used to selectively reinforce around these holes with curvilinear patterns reducing the effective initial crack propagation locations. This can allow for a thinner material at the hole’s location, and even potentially the removal of metal reinforcing washers.

Optimization four: Tunable localized thickness
Another interesting optimization that can occur when using tailored fiber placement in carbon fiber composites utilizes tunable thickness of the process over a given area. In traditional laminate design, carbon fiber composites are presumed to have even thickness. However, tailored fiber placement does not have such a height restriction. In combination with well-designed molding and fixtures, carbon fiber preforms can create localized thickness in highly complicated and varied geometries. In classical beam theory, the moment of inertia for a rectangular beam can be calculated by:

Where the height of the material (h) is shown to have cubic influence on the moment of inertia when compared to the base (b) length. This means that localized areas of height can be created with tailored fiber placement that significantly can help to better resist bending at that location. This optimization allows for decreased material usage to achieve the same, if not improved, bulk material properties when compared to other composite processes. ZSK offers machines that can lay fibers up to 8 mm thick. This averages out to about 8 layers of 50 K carbon fiber roving. This thickness can be uniform over the entire surface of the preform part or can be selectively placed in key structural areas for additional material conscience mechanical support.

Optimization five: Comingled fibrous materials
One of the drawbacks of traditional composite laminate manufacturing can be the long cycle times required to properly cure a thermoset resin. New materials, called comingled fibers, have been created to decease the processing time. In comingled fibers, a carbon fiber tow has additional thermoplastic matrix materials added directly into its fiber structure. These comingled materials can be stitched in the same manner as other tailored fiber placement composite materials. However, these preforms can quickly be thermocycled in a heated press to rapidly reduce the cycle processing time. Traditional thermoset composite materials using resin transfer molding can require between 30 minutes to 40 hours to properly set and cure a single piece. Tailored fiber placement of comingled materials allows for the placement of both the reinforcing fiber, and the matrix material in the same preform. As the preform is heated, the liquid matrix is distributed directly into the carbon fiber allowing proper wetting. The tailored fiber placement of comingled fibers eliminates the need for additional resins and can significantly reduce materials cost. Additionally, the desired fiber to volume fraction is created during the comingling step, increasing the uniformity of the composite material from batch to batch. Finally, these comingled fiber composites are a step towards a more sustainable carbon fiber composite due to their ability to be re-melted into new forms at the end of their lifecycle.

Optimization six: Machine versatility without retooling
Another significant process optimization that occurs with tailored fiber placement when compared with other composite processes, is the ability for the production machine to rapidly change its production from one design to a completely different design without any additional retooling of the machine. This can allow the same machine to seamlessly transfer from producing car parts in the morning shift to sporting equipment in the afternoon shift. Additionally, tailored fiber placement can allow the same machine to produce one prototype design at a time to investigate a process and troubleshoot it without wasting excess material, to creating a full production run simultaneously. This rapid prototyping to production capability, in combination with the ability for a machine to run many different types and geometries of parts in rapid succession, allows for more versatile projects to be run on the same machine. This reduces the cost of setting up a new machine each time a new design is generated. In conclusion, the six methods of optimization for carbon fiber composites briefly presented show some of the advantages of tailored fiber placement over traditional composite processes. It is hoped that the combination of these optimization methods, in conjunction with a trend of decreasing carbon fiber material costs, will allow a new class of ubiquitous and highly engineered materials to further improve consumer use cases like fuel efficiency.

Applications for structural parts

The TFP technology allows the fabrication of preforms tailored for specific composite components or reinforcements. Applications range from highly accelerated lightweight parts for industrial robots or blades for compressors up to CFRP aircraft parts, e.g. I-beam for the NH-90 helicopter, automotive structures and bicycle parts.

TFP for self-heating tooling and components

Using the carbon roving as an electric heating element offers the possibility to manufacture composite structures with embedded heating layers. Due to the high flexibility in the design of the heating pattern an overall nearly equal heat distribution can be achieved. In terms of applications this technology embedded in solid composite molds is very beneficial for resin consolidation and binder activation in out-of-autoclave processes. Composite molds show similar heat expansion properties as the manufactured composite parts. The lower thermal mass of composite tools compared to common metal molds help to shorten the manufacturing cycle of FRP parts and decrease the energy need for the production process. Further the TFP heating elements can be applied in CFRP wing structures of airplanes or blades of wind mills for anti- and de-icing tasks. The TFP structure embedded in elastomeric heating bags can applied to manufacturing or repairing processes of composite parts.

References

External links 
 Tailored Fiber Placement at the IPF Dresden
 LayStitch Technologies - Automated Tailored Fiber Placement Machines and Solutions

Composite material fabrication techniques